Evander "Ziggy" Hood (born February 16, 1987) is a former American football defensive tackle. He played college football at Missouri, and was drafted by the Pittsburgh Steelers in the first round (32nd overall) of the 2009 NFL Draft. Hood has also played for the Jacksonville Jaguars, Chicago Bears, Washington Redskins, Miami Dolphins, and New Orleans Saints.

Early years
Hood attended Palo Duro High School in Amarillo, Texas, where he was a two-sport star in both football and track. In high school football, he earned All-District honors his junior and senior seasons. As a junior, he made 76 tackles, including 5.0 sacks and returned an interception for a touchdown. As a senior, he was named 3-4A Defensive Player of the Year after making 93 tackles, including 13.0 sacks, and scoring three defensive touchdowns.

In track and field, Hood was one of the states top performers in the throwing events. He got top-throws of 15.50 meters (50 ft 8in) in the shot put and 50.55 meters (165 ft 7in) in the discus throw.

College career
Hood played college football at the University of Missouri.  During his college career, he played defensive tackle. He finished with 170 tackles (98 solos), 15.5 sacks, 22.5 tackles for loss and 22 quarterback pressures. He also had five forced fumbles, recovering three.

Professional career

Pittsburgh Steelers

He was selected in the first round, 32nd overall, by the Pittsburgh Steelers in the 2009 NFL Draft. He moved to defensive end in the Steelers' 3–4 defense, and served as a rotational back-up in his rookie year. Hood recorded both his first sack and first recovered fumble against the Baltimore Ravens on December 27, 2009.

At the end of the 2010 season, Hood and the Steelers appeared in Super Bowl XLV against the Green Bay Packers. He had one total tackle in the 31–25 loss.

Jacksonville Jaguars
On March 13, 2014, Hood signed a four-year, $16 million contract with the Jacksonville Jaguars. The Jaguars released him on October 20, 2015.

Chicago Bears
On October 22, 2015, the Chicago Bears signed Hood following the release of Jeremiah Ratliff. On December 15, 2015, he was waived.

Washington Redskins

On February 2, 2016, Hood signed a one-year contract with the Washington Redskins. Hood re-signed on March 15, 2017.

On October 16, 2018, Hood was released by the Redskins.

Miami Dolphins
On October 30, 2018, Hood was signed by the Miami Dolphins.

New Orleans Saints
On July 24, 2019, Hood signed with the New Orleans Saints. He was released on August 31, 2019.

NFL statistics

Personal life
Hood was named by his father after former professional boxer Evander Holyfield, of whom his father was a fan. He is of half Mexican ancestry. During his childhood, his Mexican grandmother could not correctly pronounce Evander, so she started calling him by the name of her favorite cartoon character, Ziggy.

References

External links
Missouri Tigers bio 
Washington Redskins bio 

1987 births
Living people
Palo Duro High School alumni
Sportspeople from Amarillo, Texas
Players of American football from Texas
American sportspeople of Mexican descent
American football defensive tackles
American football defensive ends
Missouri Tigers football players
Pittsburgh Steelers players
Jacksonville Jaguars players
Chicago Bears players
Washington Redskins players
Miami Dolphins players
New Orleans Saints players